The term personal communicator has been used with several meanings. Around 1990 the next generation digital mobile phones were called digital personal communicators. Another definition, coined in 1991, is for a category of handheld devices that provide personal information manager functions and packet switched wireless data communications capabilities over wireless wide area networks such as cellular networks.  These devices are now commonly referred to as smartphones.

See also
AT&T EO Personal Communicator, 1993
IBM Simon Personal Communicator, 1994
Nokia Communicator
Wireless PDA
Smartphone

External links
Concept genesis, Aug 1991
The Executive Computer; 'Mother of All Markets' or a 'Pipe Dream Driven by Greed'? NYT, July 1992
EO Inc. Describes 'Personal Communicator' Devices, New York Times,1992
Motorola expands family of personal communicator products, Mobile Phone News,1993
Bellsouth, IBM unveil personal communicator phone, Mobile Phone News,1993
The EO 440 And EO 880 Paradigms For Personal Communicators, Mobile Computing,1993 
The Return of the PDA, Marketing Computers,1995 

Personal digital assistants
Mobile computers